Paramount Communications, Inc. v. Time Inc., C.A. Nos. 10866, 10670, 10935 (Consol.), 1989 Del. Ch. LEXIS 77, Fed. Sec. L. Rep. (CCH) ¶ 94, 514 (Del. Ch. July 14, 1989), aff'd, 571 A.2d 1140 (Del. 1989), is a U.S. corporate law case from Delaware, concerning defensive measures in the mergers and acquisitions context. The Delaware Court of Chancery and the Supreme Court of Delaware upheld the use of defensive measures to advance the long-term goals of the target corporation, where the corporation was not in "Revlon mode".

Facts
Time Inc. and Warner Communications were planning to merge. Time wished to get more into the television business with its HBO channel, and wanted Warner Communications's help. Then, Paramount made an offer to all the shareholders of $200 per share (up from an initial $175). Time shares had been trading at $120. Time had a range of defenses, including a staggered board, a 50-day notice period for any shareholder motion, and a poison pill plan with a 15% trigger. However, with the Paramount threat, Time went further. Initially, the Warner deal was planned as a stock-for-stock merger; in the face of the Paramount threat, Time and Warner directors changed it into a leveraged purchase transaction. The NYSE required that shareholder approval be given for transfers of 20% or more of a corporation's outstanding shares. Therefore, this change in the structure of the transaction meant that existing Time shareholders would not be given a say.

Accordingly, both Paramount and other shareholders sought to enjoin the board from following the merger through (and thwarting Paramount's offer with its cash out option).

Court of Chancery judgment
Chancellor Allen held that the takeover defenses were proportionate to the threat posed to the culture of the company. It followed that the board had not breached its duties.

Supreme Court judgment
On appeal to the Supreme Court of Delaware, Justice Henry Horsey affirmed the outcome reached by the Court of Chancery, on partly different grounds: that the target corporation did not face "breakup", a condition necessary at the time to invoke Revlon duties.

The "breakup" test for crossing the Revlon threshold was later replaced with the "fundamental change" test, which encompasses both breakup and change of control, in the 1994 case of Paramount Communications, Inc. v. QVC Network, Inc..

See also
United States corporate law

Notes

Delaware state case law
United States corporate case law
Warner Bros. Discovery
Paramount Global
1989 in United States case law